Year 1180 (MCLXXX) was a leap year starting on Tuesday (link will display the full calendar) of the Julian calendar.

Events 
 By place 

 Byzantine Empire 
 September 24 – Emperor Manuel I (Komnenos) dies after a 37-year reign at Constantinople. He is succeeded by his 11-year-old son Alexios II – who will reign briefly as ruler of the Byzantine Empire with his mother, Maria of Antioch as regent (until 1183). Maria takes as her advisor and lover, Alexios Komnenos, a nephew of Manuel, causing a scandal among the Byzantine population.

 Europe 
 January 13 – Henry the Lion, duke of Saxony, loses his Saxon and Bavarian duchies and all his imperial fiefs at an Imperial Diet in Würzburg for having breached the king's peace. Emperor Frederick I (Barbarossa) issues the Gelnhausen Charter on April 13. He breaks up Henry's former domain; one part of Saxony is renamed the Duchy of Westphalia, and other parts are given to his ally Otto I (the Redhead), duke of Bavaria. 
 September 18 – King Louis VII (the Younger) dies after a 43-year reign at Paris. He is succeeded by his 15-year-old son Philip II, who becomes sole ruler of France (until 1223).
 The Portuguese admiral D. Fuas Roupinho wins a second victory in two years, against the Almohad fleet.
 The assembly traditionally regarded as the first Sejm of the Kingdom of Poland convenes at Łęczyca (approximate date).

 England 
 Portsmouth is founded by the Norman merchant Jean de Gisors, establishing a trade route between England and France (approximate date).

 Levant  
 Summer – King Baldwin IV (the Leper) sends messengers to Saladin with proposals of a peace treaty. Because of a terrible drought, the whole of Syria is faced with famine. Saladin agrees to a two-year truce. Raymond of Tripoli denounces the truce, but is compelled to accept it after an Ayyubid fleet raids the port of Tartus.
 Saladin intervenes in a quarrel between the Zangids of Mosul and the Artuqids. He convinces the Seljuks of the Sultanate of Rum not to interfere and raids Cilician Armenia.
 Baldwin IV marries his sister Sibylla to Guy of Lusignan, brother of the constable Amalric of Lusignan, and enfeoffed him with the County of Jaffa and Ascalon.

 Asia 
 March 18 – Emperor Takakura is forced to abdicate by Taira no Kiyomori after a 12-year reign. He is succeeded by his 2-year-old son Antoku as emperor of Japan (until 1185). Kiyomori rules in his name as regent.
 Genpei War: Prince Mochihito begins a revolt against the Taira clan. In support, Minamoto no Yorimasa sends out a call for aid, and to the monasteries (Enryaku-ji, Mii-dera and others) that Kiyomori has offended.
 June 20 – Battle of Uji: Mochihito and Minamoto no Yorimasa go into hiding in the Byōdō-in Temple. There, they seek help from the warrior monks to join the battle but are defeated and killed by the Taira forces.
 September 14 – Battle of Ishibashiyama: Taira forces (3,000 men) under Ōba Kagechika defeat Minamoto no Yoritomo during a night attack near Mount Fuji (modern-day Odawara) but he flees by sea to Chiba.
 November 10 – Battle of Fujigawa: Minamoto forces (30,000 men) under Minamoto no Yoritomo defeat Taira no Koremori during a night attack near the Fuji River but he escapes safely with the routed army.

 By topic 

 Culture 
 Alexander Neckam becomes a lecturer in Paris, and writes De Natura Rerum, an early mention of chess (approximate date).

 Demography 
 Hangzhou, capital of Southern Song China, becomes the largest city of the world, taking the lead from Fez in the Almohad Caliphate.

Births 
 August 6 – Go-Toba, emperor of Japan (d. 1239)
 Alfonso II (Berenguer), count of Provence (d. 1209)
 Berengaria (the Great), queen of Castile and León (d. 1246)
 Eric X (Knutsson), king of Sweden (approximate date)
 Fernán Gutiérrez de Castro, Spanish nobleman (d. 1223)
 Gilbert de Clare, English nobleman (approximate date)
 Guala de Roniis, Italian priest and bishop (d. 1244)
 Hawise of Chester, English noblewoman (d. 1143)
 Ibn Abi Tayyi, Syrian historian and poet (d. 1228)
 Kambar, Indian Hindu poet and writer (d. 1250)
 Paulus Hungarus, Hungarian theologian (d. 1241)
 Philip of Ibelin, Cypriot nobleman and regent (d. 1227)
 Raimbaut de Vaqueiras, French troubadour (d. 1207) 
 Robert de Bingham, bishop of Salisbury (d. 1246)
 Robert of Burgate, English nobleman (d. 1220)
 Simon of Dammartin, French nobleman (d. 1239)

Deaths 
 January 23 – Eberhard I, count of Berg-Altena (b. 1140)
 January 29 – Soběslav II, duke of Bohemia (b. 1128)
 February 6 – Teresa Fernández de Traba, queen of León
 March 27 – Al-Mustadi, caliph of the Abbasid Caliphate (b. 1142)
 June 20 
 Minamoto no Yorimasa, Japanese military leader (b. 1106)
 Mochihito, Japanese prince and son of Go-Shirakawa
 June 27 – Turan-Shah, Ayyubid emir (prince) of Damascus 
 July 1 – Stephanie (the Unfortunate), Spanish noblewoman
 August 11 – William of Sens (or Guillaume), French architect
 September 18 – Louis VII (the Younger), king of France (b. 1120)
 September 24 – Manuel I (Komnenos), Byzantine emperor (b. 1118)
 October 6 – Amalric of Nesle, French prelate and Latin patriarch
 October 25 – John of Salisbury, English philosopher and bishop 
 November 14 – Lorcán Ua Tuathail, Irish archbishop (b. 1128)
 Abraham ibn Daud, Spanish-Jewish philosopher (b. 1110)
 Abū Ṭāhir al-Silafī, Fatimid scholar and writer (b. 1079)
 John Tzetzes, Byzantine poet and grammarian (b. 1110)
 Joscelin of Louvain, Flemish nobleman (b. 1121)
 Raynerius of Split, Italian monk and archbishop
 Zhu Shuzhen, Chinese poet and writer (b. 1135)

References